Manithali is a 1984 Indian Malayalam film, scripted by Moidu Padiyath directed by M. Krishnan Nair and produced by T. E. Vasudevan. The film stars Prem Nazir, Mammootty, Unnimary and Balan K. Nair in the lead roles. The film has musical score by A. T. Ummer.

Plot
Zulfikar (Mammootty) and Ramlath (Seema) are happily married. Zulfikar's family disapproves of his marriage while his father-in-law Judgal Abu (Balan K. Nair) is not happy about Zulfikar not providing him with handouts.

Judgal Abu meets Kunjumuhammed (Prem Nazir) a divorced rich man returning to the village. Judgal Abu plots a scheme in hope of financial handouts from Kunjumuhammed. He manages to create a misunderstanding between Zulfikar and Ramlath. He forces Zulfikar to divorce Ramlath. A disappointed Zulfikar runs away from the village. Judgal Abu forces Ramlath to marry Kunjumuhammed.

On the first night, Ramlath  reveals to Kunjumuhammed  that she is pregnant with Zulfikar's child. Kunjumuhammed, though disappointed, promises Ramlath that he will bring back Zulfikar.

Cast
Prem Nazir as  Kunjumuhammed
Mammootty as Zulfikar
Seema as Ramlath
Unnimary as Sajna
Balan K. Nair as Dajjal Abu
Bahadoor as Kunjanikka (Marriage Consultant)
Mala Aravindan as Subaid (Man servant)
Paul Vengola
Shubha as Mariyamma
Sankaradi as Musthafakka (Restaurant owner)
Adoor Bhasi as Abdullakunji (Zulfikar's father)
Kunchan as Kili
Jose Prakash
Kaviyoor Ponnamma as Zulfikar's mother
Adoor Bhavani as Chenachi Umma (Maid servant)

Soundtrack
The music was composed by A. T. Ummer and the lyrics were written by P. Bhaskaran.

References

External links
 

1984 films
1980s Malayalam-language films
Films directed by M. Krishnan Nair